Przemyśl Voivodeship  was a unit of administrative division and local government in Poland in the years 1975–1998, superseded by the Podkarpackie Voivodeship. Its capital city was Przemyśl.

Major cities and towns (population in 1995)
 Przemyśl (68,900)
 Jarosław (41,800)

See also
 Voivodeships of Poland

Former voivodeships of Poland (1975–1998)
Przemyśl
History of Podkarpackie Voivodeship